The Etisalat Prize for Innovation was created by Etisalat Nigeria in 2012, aimed at encouraging and celebrating valuable innovation in the African market. The prize is annually awarded in two categories, both with the purpose of driving or facilitating mobile broadband utilisation in Africa. The first prize of $25,000 is for the most innovative product or service launched in the previous year and a second prize of $10,000 for the most innovative idea.

Entry criteria
Entries for the award must show demonstrable impact on broadband usage, impressive uptake from customers and have visible commercial impact in the community. Entries are open to innovative Broadband products or services using the GSM network family (2G GPRS & EDGE, 3G, HSPA, LTE) including Value Added Service providers, App Developers and other service providers making use of mobile broadband capability.

Winners and nominees
The first edition of the Etisalat Prize for Innovation announced the shortlist of four nominees in October 2012, two nominees in both the Most Innovative Product/Service category and the Most Innovative Idea category. The winners for each category were announced at the 2012 AfricaCom Awards in Cape Town, South Africa.

Most Innovative Product/Service 2012
 Mobile Maths Practice (winner) – Olaseni Odebiyi
 TVplus – Olalekan Ayorinde

Most Innovative Idea 2012
 i-Connect Project (winner) – Oyehmi Begho
 Cartoon Afrik – Ololade Babalola

Most Innovative Product/Service 2013
 Genni Games (winner)
 Spantree SpanBox ONE

Most Innovative Idea 2013
 Efiwe Mobile Application (winner)- Uche Okocha
 Quality & Cheap Education for all

Most Innovative Product/Service 2014
 Exammate Application (winner)
 Akpos Mobile Application

Most Innovative Idea 2014
 IMID Mobile Application (winner)
 Mamalette

Most Innovative Product/Service 2015
 Studylab maths (winner) – Obi Brown
 Digital Back Books

Most Innovative Idea 2015
 Dedicated Traffic Mapping Device (winner) – Chijioke Ezegbo
 Traffigator Tech

Most Innovative Product/Service 2016
 OneMedical/Helium Healthcare (winner) – Adegoke Olubusi

Most Innovative Idea 2016
  Dresses By Aloli (winner) – Tobilola Ajibola

References

External links
 Official site of Etisalat Nigeria
 Official site of the Etisalat Prize for Innovation

Innovation organizations
Prize for Innovation